An Gyeon was a Korean painter of the early Joseon period. He was born in Jigok, Seosan, Chungcheongnam-do. He entered royal service as a member of the Dohwaseo, the official painters of the Joseon court. In 1447, he drew  (몽유도원도), a landscape painting for Prince Anpyeong. Considered the oldest landscape painting by a Korean artist, the painting is currently stored at Tenri University.

Names 
His art name was Hyeonndongja (현동자, 玄洞子) and his courtesy name was Gado (가도, 可度).

Gallery

See also
Korean art
Korean culture
Korean painting
List of Korean painters

References

External links
Brief biography of An Gyeon and gallery 
Info about Jigok An Gyeon Festival 

Year of death unknown
Year of birth unknown
15th-century Korean painters